The 2014–15 Tulane Green Wave men's basketball team represented Tulane University during the 2014–15 NCAA Division I men's basketball season. The Green Wave, led by fifth year head coach Ed Conroy, played their home games at Devlin Fieldhouse and were first years members of the American Athletic Conference. They finished the season 15–16, 6–12 in AAC play to finish in a tie for seventh place. They lost in the first round of the American Athletic tournament to Houston.

Previous season 
The Green Wave finished the season 17–17, 8–8 in C-USA play to finish in seventh place. They advanced to the quarterfinals of the C-USA tournament where they lost to Tulsa. They were invited to the College Basketball Invitational where the lost in the first round to Princeton.

Departures

Incoming Transfers

Incoming recruits

Roster

}

Schedule

|-
!colspan=9 style="background:#00331A; color:#87CEEB;"|  Exhibition

|-
!colspan=9 style="background:#00331A; color:#87CEEB;"|  Non-conference regular season

|-
!colspan=9 style="background:#00331A; color:#87CEEB;"|  Conference regular season

|-
!colspan=9 style="background:#063003; color:#CCEEFF;"| 2015 American Athletic Conference tournament

References

Tulane Green Wave men's basketball seasons
Tulane
Tulane
Tulane